Corporal is a military rank in use in some form by the armed forces of many countries. It is also in use by some police forces or other uniformed organizations. The word is derived from the medieval Italian phrase  ("head of a body"). The rank is usually the lowest ranking non-commissioned officer.

In some militaries, the rank of corporal nominally corresponds to commanding a section or squad of soldiers.

By country

Argentina 
NCOs in the Argentine Armed Forces are divided into junior and senior NCOs, with three and four ranks, respectively. The three junior ranks are called "corporal" (cabo) in both the Navy and the Air Force, while in the Army the third rank is called "sergeant" (sargento).

National Gendarmerie and Coast Guard junior NCOs ranks are similar to those in the Army and Navy, respectively.

Australia 
Corporal is the second lowest of the non-commissioned officer ranks in the Australian Army, falling between lance-corporal and sergeant. A corporal is usually appointed as a section commander, and is in charge of 7–14 soldiers of private rank. They are assisted by a second-in-command, usually a lance-corporal or senior private. A Corporal within Artillery is known as a bombardier. Corporal is also a rank of the Royal Australian Air Force, being equal to both the Australian Army and Royal Air Force rank of corporal.

Bangladesh 
Corporal is a non-commissioned officer rank in the Bangladesh Army, falling between lance-corporal and sergeant, and in the Bangladesh Air Force, falling between leading aircraftman and sergeant.

Belgium 
The branches of the Belgian Armed Forces use three ranks of corporal: corporal, master corporal and 1st master corporal. Corporal is equivalent to NATO Rank Code OR-3, whereas master corporal and 1st master corporal are equivalent to OR-4. The rank immediately below corporal is 1st private and the rank directly above 1st master corporal is sergeant.

Units with a cavalry, artillery or Logistic Corps (Transport unit) tradition replace Corporal by "Brigadier".

The equivalent of these ranks in the Naval Component are quartermaster, chief quartermaster and 1st chief quartermaster.

Belarus 

The Byelorussian Home Defence (February 23, 1944 – April 28, 1945) used the kapral, in the meaning of Corporal as enlisted grade, equivalent to Obergefreiter, Hauptgefreiter or Stabsgefreiter of the German Wehrmacht (1933-1945).

Brazil 
Corporal (in Portuguese cabo) is the first NCO rank of the Army, Navy, Air Force and states military police forces. Soldiers who successfully complete the corporal course may be promoted to the rank of corporal should they excel in the course. A corporal in the Brazilian Army will lead the smallest fractions of units as machine gun squads, mortar and infantry squads.

Canada 
Corporal is an Army and Air Force non-commissioned member rank of the Canadian Forces. Its Naval equivalent is leading sailor. It is senior to the rank of private and its naval equivalent able sailor, and junior to master corporal (caporal-chef) and its equivalent master sailor (matelot-chef). It is part of the cadre of junior non-commissioned officers, and one of the junior ranks. In French, the rank is caporal.

The rank insignia of a corporal is a two-bar chevron, point down, worn in gold thread on both upper sleeves of the service dress jacket; in rifle green (army) or dark blue (air force) thread on CADPAT slip-ons for operational dress; in old gold thread on blue slip-ons on other air force uniforms; and in gold metal and green enamel miniature pins on the collars of the army dress shirt and outerwear coats. On army ceremonial uniforms, it is usually rendered in gold braid (black for rifle regiments), on either both sleeves, or just the right, depending on unit custom.

Corporal is the first non-commissioned officer rank, and the lowest rank officially empowered to issue a lawful command. Corporals can lead troops if they have the formal qualifications to be promoted to master corporal but have not been promoted yet. However, the rank of corporal was severely downgraded after Unification, along with the attendant responsibilities. A corporal in the Canadian Army in 1967 had the same duties and responsibilities that a sergeant has today. In an infantry section, a corporal will sometimes command an assault team if a master corporal is leading the section or they are pending promotion to master corporal.

Another effect of Unification was to delete the appointments of lance-corporal and lance-sergeant (a corporal holding the acting rank of sergeant). The former is still common in other Commonwealth militaries.

Corporal is deemed to be the substantive rank of the members carrying the appointment of master corporal. On pay documents, corporal was formerly listed as "Cpl (A)" and master corporal as "Cpl (B)".

In rifle regiments, a distinction was historically drawn between a corporal and an acting corporal; The Queen's Own Rifles of Canada had a special insignia to distinguish between the two.

Chile 
In the Army, Navy, Air Force and Police, there are three grades of Corporal: Corporal, Corporal 2nd. and Corporal 1st. The next level is Sergeant 2nd. grade.

France 
There are three ranks of corporal. In the French Army, these are not NCO ranks, but enlisted ones. The corporals are called "ranked".

In regiments with a cavalry tradition, using white insigna, and artillery,  is used instead.

India 

These ranks are still used in the Indian Air Force. it is a rank given to an airman who is senior to leading aircraftman but junior to a sergeant. A corporal is designated as a Non-Commissioned Officer in the Indian Air Force.

Indonesia 

In Indonesia, "Corporal" has three levels, which are: Second Corporal (Lance Corporal), First Corporal (Corporal), and Master Corporal.

Ireland 

Corporal is the lowest rank of non-commissioned officer within the Irish Army and Air Corps. The Naval Service equivalent is leading seaman.

Army 
The main role of an infantry corporal is either to command a section as the section commander or to command the fire support group as the second in command of the section. All corporals are qualified instructors on drill, section weapons, and fieldcraft.

In the Artillery Corps, the corporal is normally assigned to a gun detachment as a layer, or a detachment commander. Artillery corporals can also find themselves in charge of the battery signals section.

The army rank insignia consists of two winged chevrons (or "stripes"), the dress uniform being red chevrons with a yellow border.

Air Corps 
Before 1994, the Air Corps was considered part of the army and wore army uniforms with distinct corps badges but the same rank insignia. With the introduction of a unique Air Corps blue uniform in 1994, the same rank markings in a white colour were worn, before the introduction of a new two-chevron badge with wing rank marking.

Italy 
A soldier could be promoted from private (soldato) to corporal rank (caporale) after 3 months of service until 2014, now they have to pass a selection to be promoted to corporal. The title was used as a senior office in the Italian Kingdom during World War II.

New Zealand 
The New Zealand Defence Force awards the corporal rank to soldiers or airmen after 6 or 7 years of service. There is substantial responsibility on the part of a corporal in the New Zealand Army and Royal New Zealand Air Force. They usually command a small team and work closely with their sergeants. A pay increase is also given.

Like their British, Canadian and Australian counterparts, they wear two chevrons to distinguish their rank.

Corporals have what is termed 'power of arrest', and is impressed on recruits in RNZAF basic training. Basically, this power means that any airman or private disobeying or ignoring an order from a corporal will be subject to military arrest by that individual. Power of arrest is used by higher ranks to enforce their orders, corporal in the RNZAF being the lowest rank with this power.

Pakistan 
These ranks are still used in the Pakistan Air Force. it is a rank given to an airman who is senior to leading aircraftsman but junior to a sergeant.

Philippines  
In the Armed Forces of the Philippines, the rank Corporal is locally called as Kabo. It is currently being used by both the Philippine Army and the Philippine Marine Corps. It stand above the rank of private first class and below sergeant.

The Philippine Revolutionary Army also used corporal as part of their ranks during the Philippine Revolution and the Philippine–American War. It is the lowest enlisted personnel rank on the service, below the rank of sergeant.

As of February 8, 2019, a new ranking classification for the Philippine National Police was adopted, eliminating confusion of old ranks. The rank of corporal is included on the new ranking classification. It is the second from the bottom, placing above the rank of Patrolman and below police staff sergeant.

Poland 
Most commonly the rank is held by a NCO commanding an infantry squad, tank or gun crew, or a similar unit.

As with many other military ranks, direct comparison between various armies might be misleading. Before World War II, the Polish Army's  was more or less equivalent to the British rank of lance corporal, while the British rank of corporal was named  (lit. platooner). "senior corporal"), which was introduced in 1971.

Historically, the rank was first introduced in Poland in the 17th century, together with mercenary troops of Italian origin. In foreign troops on the royal payroll, a  commanded four ranks of musketeers or part of a company of pikemen. In the 20th century, between the world wars, the rank of corporal was held by both conscripted NCOs and professional soldiers alike. In the modern Polish Army, the rank is exclusively reserved for professional soldiers.

Portugal 
All other branches of the Portuguese Armed Forces have several ranks of corporal ( in Portuguese).

The several ranks of corporal correspond to the several pay grades, above that of private, that can be reached inside the enlisted rank professional category of the Army, the Air Force and the National Republican Guard.

Russia 
Soviet and modern Russian armies have the rank of "" (derived from the German ) as the highest rank of enlisted personnel, below lance (or junior) sergeant which are assigned as squad leaders.

Singapore

Singapore Armed Forces 
The Corporal rank in the Singapore Armed Forces is between the rank of Lance Corporal and Corporal First Class. National Servicemen are usually promoted to this rank within the 2nd year of their service.

Prior to 1992, the SAF followed the British model where corporals were non-commissioned officers often holding the appointment of section leader. Today, a corporal is not a specialist (NCO-equivalent). Corporals are usually given higher responsibilities/ appointments as a section 2IC, or 2nd-in-command.

Home Team 
In the Singapore Police Force, Singapore Civil Defence Force, Singapore Prison Service, Immigration and Checkpoints Authority and Singapore Customs, a corporal is a rank below sergeant.

The rank insignia for a corporal is two chevrons pointing downwards.

Uniformed youth organisations 
For the National Cadet Corps (NCC), the rank of Corporal is below the rank of Third Sergeant, and above the rank of Lance Corporal. For the National Police Cadet Corps (NPCC) and the National Civil Defence Cadet Corps (NCDCC), the rank of Corporal is below the rank of Sergeant, and above the rank of Lance Corporal.

For NCC, the rank insignia is same as that of an SAF CPL, except that the letters 'NCC' are below the insignia, so as to differentiate NCC cadets from SAF personnel. As for NPCC and NCDCC, the rank insignia is two pointed-down chevrons with the letters 'NPCC' and 'NCDCC' below the insignia, so as to differentiate NPCC and NCDCC cadets from Singapore Police Force and Singapore Civil Defence Force personnel, respectively.

The rank of Corporal is generally awarded to cadets in Secondary Two, or Secondary Three. Corporals, after being appointed, are given training to command a squad.

Spain 

Ukraine 
Since 2015, the Corporal, was introduced in the National Police of Ukraine, that is a special rank of junior quarterdeck. It corresponds to former junior sergeant of militia. Also since 2018–19, the Corporal was introduced in the Court Security Service, and the DBR as a special rank of junior quarterdeck.

United Kingdom 
The rank of corporal, which falls between lance-corporal and sergeant is used by the British Army, Royal Marines, and Royal Air Force.
 
The badge of rank is a two-bar chevron (also known as "stripes", "tapes", or "hooks"). A corporal's role varies between regiments; but, in the standard infantry role, a corporal commands a section, with a lance-corporal as second-in-command (2ic). When the section is split into fire teams, they command one each. In the Royal Armoured Corps, a corporal commands an individual tank. Their duties therefore largely correspond to those of staff sergeants in the United States Army and corporals are often described as the "backbone" of the British Army.

In the Household Cavalry, all non-commissioned ranks are designated as different grades of corporal up to regimental corporal major (who is a warrant officer class 1). There is no effective actual rank of corporal, however, and the ranks progress directly from lance-corporal to lance-corporal of horse (who is effectively equivalent to a corporal; technically, a lance-corporal of horse holds the rank of corporal but is automatically give the appointment of lance-corporal of horse). Similarly, in the Foot Guards and in the Honourable Artillery Company, every Corporal is appointed as a lance-sergeant meaning they wear three chevrons rather than the regular two, with a lance-corporal wearing two chevrons instead of one: this is sometimes said to have originated with Queen Victoria who did not like "her own guardsmen" having only one chevron.

Royal Artillery corporals are called bombardiers; although, until 1920, the Royal Artillery had corporals and bombardier was a lower rank. The rank of second corporal existed in the Royal Engineers and Royal Army Ordnance Corps until 1920.

A common nickname for a corporal is a "full screw", with lance-corporals being known as "lance-jacks".

Corporal is the lowest NCO rank in the Royal Air Force (aside from the RAF Regiment who have lance-corporals), coming between junior technician or Senior aircraftman technician and sergeant in the technical trades, or senior aircraftman and sergeant in the non-technical trades. Between 1950 and 1964, corporals in technical trades were known as "corporal technicians" and wore their chevrons point up.

In the Royal Navy, the equivalent to corporal is leading hand or leading rate.

The Army Cadet Force, Combined Cadet Force, Air Training Corps, Royal Marines sections of the Sea Cadet Corps and the Combined Cadet Force all have the rank of corporal, reflecting the structure of their parent service; therefore it is the second NCO rank of the ACF, CCF (including the RAF Section, which has the rank of lance corporal) and marine cadets, and the first NCO rank in the ATC.

United States

United States Army 
In the U.S. Army, corporal is preceded by the first three forms of private and the rank of specialist. A corporal rank shares the same pay grade (E-4) as a specialist. Unlike a specialist, however, a corporal is a non-commissioned officer and may direct the activities of other soldiers. 

The rank of corporal dates to the Revolutionary War. Each company in the Continental Army contained an enlisted contingent of a sergeant, corporal, and nineteen privates. The corporal, along with the superior sergeant, were responsible for the care, discipline, and training of their men. After the Civil War, U.S. Army infantry strategy increasingly focused on units below the company level. In 1891, a squad was defined as an eight-man unit led by a corporal, a definition which held through World War I until the eve of the U.S. entry into World War II.

In 1940, with the recognition of the increasing importance of small-unit tactics, the size of the squad was increased to twelve men, now led by a sergeant, with a corporal as assistant squad leader. In February 1944, the squad leader became a staff sergeant, assisted by a sergeant, dropping the corporal from the infantry company's chain of command. As a result of this "steady inflation" of the NCO corps, writes historian Ernest F. Fisher, "the rank of corporal came to mean very little in a line organization, though the corporal was in theory and by tradition a combat leader." After the Korean War, squad leaders were further promoted to sergeant first class (E-7), and the "once-honored rank of corporal sank into oblivion."

Beginning in July 2021, specialists who are graduates of the Basic Leader Course (BLC) and who have been recommended for promotion are to become corporals before further promotion; conversely current corporals who have not yet graduated from BLC will be laterally reassigned as specialists until they have graduated from BLC. No change in pay is involved, but corporals are expected to lead, teach, and mentor their teams.

United States Marine Corps 

Corporal is the fourth enlisted rank in the U.S. Marine Corps, ranking immediately above lance corporal and immediately below sergeant. The Marine Corps, unlike the Army, has no other rank at the pay grade of E-4. Corporal is the lowest grade of non-commissioned officer in the U.S. Marine Corps, though promotion to corporal traditionally confers a significant jump in authority and responsibility compared to promotion from private through lance corporal. Marine infantry corporals generally serve as "fire-team leaders", leading a four-man team or weapons crew of similar size (e.g., assault weapons squad, medium machine gun team, or LWCMS mortar squad).

In practice, however, the billet of fire team leader is generally held by a lance corporal, while corporals serve in the squad leader billet that would normally be held by a sergeant (E-5) in infantry units. In support units, corporals generally serve in "journeyman" level roles in which they direct the activities of junior Marines and provide technical supervision, on a very limited scope, under the direct supervision of a sergeant or SNCO.

Due to its emphasis on small-unit tactics, its infantry-centric ethos, and its tradition of empowering junior NCOs to exercise first-level leadership, the U.S. Marine Corps' Tables of Organization (TOs) usually places corporals (as well as sergeants and staff sergeants) in billets where other services would normally have higher ranking NCOs in authority. For example, the USMC Table of Organization "billet" rank for rifle fire team leader, rifle squad leader, and rifle platoon sergeant is corporal (E-4), sergeant (E-5), and staff sergeant (E-6), respectively. However, the same positions (Table of Organization and Equipment "slots") in US Army infantry units are one grade higher and, except in fire teams (both services with four men in each team), the equivalent Army units are smaller (viz., USMC rifle squad and rifle platoon – 13 men and 43 men, respectively, vice US Army rifle squad and rifle platoon – 9 men and 34 men, respectively). Specifically, for the Army rifle units, the rank of the fire team, squad leader, and platoon sergeant are: sergeant (E-5), staff sergeant (E-6), and sergeant first class (E-7), respectively. Similarly, the term "strategic corporal" refers to the special responsibilities conferred upon a Marine corporal over against the normal responsibilities, and usual authority, of service members in the grade of E-4 in the other branches of the U.S. Armed Forces.

Until the mid-to-late 1980s, corporals were the lowest USMC rank eligible for selection as a drill instructor for USMC recruit training.

The history of the rank of corporal in the USMC roughly parallels that of the U.S. Army until 1942. From 1775 until WWII, the Marine Corps used essentially the same rank and organizational structure as its common British and colonial forebears with the Army, as well as the later Continental and U.S. armies. In 1942, as the Army modified its triangular division infantry organization to best fight in the European/North African/Middle Eastern Theatre the Marine Corps began modifying the triangular division plan to best employ its amphibious warfare doctrine in the Pacific Theatre. This meant that for the Corps, squad leaders would remain as sergeants and that the rifle squad would be sub-divided into three four-man fire teams each led by a corporal.

NATO code 
While the rank is used in a number of NATO countries, it is ranked differently depending on the country.

Gallery

See also 
 Korporal
 Lance corporal
 Corporal first class
 Corporal of the field
 Master corporal
 Corporal of horse
 Staff corporal
 Corporal Jackie
 List of comparative military ranks

References

External links 
 

Military ranks
Military ranks of Australia
Military ranks of Canada
Military ranks of Ireland
Military ranks of Singapore
Military ranks of the British Army
Military ranks of the United States Army
Military ranks of the United States Marine Corps
United States military enlisted ranks
Military ranks of the Royal Air Force
Military ranks of the Royal Marines